Luke Gale (born 22 June 1988) is an English professional rugby league footballer who last played as  or  for Keighley Cougars in the Betfred Championship and the England Knights and England at international level.

Having started his career at Leeds Rhinos, he previously played for Doncaster on loan in the National Leagues, and Harlequins RL, Bradford Bulls and the Castleford Tigers (Heritage № 952) in the Super League. He played occasionally as a  earlier in his career.

Biography
Gale was born in Leeds, Yorkshire, England on 22 June 1988.

Playing career

Doncaster RLFC
A Leeds academy graduate, Gale was sent out on loan to Doncaster in 2007 and established himself as a first-choice player, winning the National League Two Young Player of the Year award in 2008, in which he became the club's record points scorer in a season.

Harlequins RL
Gale's form at Doncaster attracted interest from Super League clubs and he moved to London's Harlequins Rugby League team.

Bradford Bulls
 
Gale spent three years at Harlequins club before joining Bradford Bulls.

Gale immediately became first-choice scrum-half for Bradford, scoring 143 points for the club in his début season. He signed a three-year extension to his contract at the start of 2013, however he missed the first three months of the season due to injury and only made 16 appearances in total during the year. 
 
Gale missed only one match for Bradford in 2014, however the team struggled on the field and the club was relegated from Super League at the end of the season, following which Gale left the club.

Castleford Tigers
Gale joined Castleford in 2015 as a replacement for the departing Marc Sneyd, and scored a try on his début for the club against Wakefield Trinity. Gale enjoyed a productive season, scoring 205 points and becoming an integral part of the team that narrowly missed out on the Super League semi-finals. His form was recognised as he won the Albert Goldthorpe Medal at the end of the season.

Gale was made acting captain for the 2016 season due to injury to Michael Shenton. Another strong season in which he topped the league for try assists saw him retain his Albert Goldthorpe medal.

In 2017, Gale played an integral role in guiding Castleford to the League Leaders' Shield, their first piece of major silverware since 1994, as well as leading the team to their maiden Grand Final appearance, which was lost 24-6 to Leeds Rhinos. Undoubtedly Gale’s best performance of the season was in Castleford’s 23-22 victory over St Helens in their Betfred Super League semi-Final, in which he converted a last-minute penalty to bring the game to golden point extra-time, before scoring the drop-goal which sent Castleford to Old Trafford for the first time in the club’s history. Just two weeks beforehand, he had undergone an emergency appendectomy operation. The following week, Gale was named 2017 Steve Prescott MBE Man of Steel for his performances throughout the season, beating team-mate Zak Hardaker and Hull FC’s Albert Kelly to the award. He also won the Albert Goldthorpe Medal for a record-breaking third consecutive year.

Leeds Rhinos
He signed for hometown club Leeds for the 2020 season, and won the Challenge Cup that season with a victory over Salford Red Devils. Gale scored the winning drop-goal in the 76th minute of the game to edge Leeds to a 17-16 victory.

Hull F.C.
On 5 November 2021 it was announced that he had signed for Hull F.C. in the Super League.

In round 1 of the 2022 Super League season, he made his club debut and scored a try in Hull F.C's 16-12 victory over Wakefield Trinity.  The following week, he was sent off for a professional foul in the clubs 38-6 loss against St. Helens R.F.C.
On 21 February, Gale was suspended for five matches over the red card against St Helens.

Keighley Cougars
Gale became a free agent at the end of the 2022 season as his contract with Hull expired. On 19 December 2022 he signed a one-year contract to join Keighley in the Championship for 2023.

International career
In 2011 and 2012, Gale played for the England Knights team. He kicked 8 goals, as well as scoring 1 try, in the Knights' 56–4 victory over Ireland in the 2012 European Cup.

After an outstanding 2015 Super League season, Gale was named in the senior England team for their end-of-year internationals against France and New Zealand, but did not make an appearance. He was selected again in England's squad for the 2016 Four Nations, making his international début in a test match against France.

He was selected in the England squad for the 2017 Rugby League World Cup, and subsequently played every game as England made the final in Melbourne, where they lost narrowly to hosts Australia.

Honours

Castleford
 Super League: 
Runners up (1): 2017

Leeds
 Challenge Cup (1): 2020

References

External links
Leeds Rhinos profile
Castleford Tigers profile
Cas Tigers profile
SL profile
Statistics at rlwc2017.com

1988 births
Living people
Bradford Bulls players
Castleford Tigers players
Doncaster R.L.F.C. players
England Knights national rugby league team players
England national rugby league team players
English rugby league players
Hull F.C. captains
Hull F.C. players
Keighley Cougars players
Leeds Rhinos captains
Leeds Rhinos players
London Broncos players
Rugby league halfbacks
Rugby league players from Leeds